This page shows the progress of Macclesfield Town F.C. in the 2010–11 football season. They competed in League Two, the fourth tier of English football, in which they finished 15th, and also competed in the FA Cup, League Cup and Football League Trophy where they were eliminated in the second round, first round and second round respectively.

League Tw0

League table

Results summary

Results by round

Results

FA Cup

League Cup

Football League Trophy

Appearances and goals
As of 6 May 2011.
(Substitute appearances in brackets)

Awards

Transfers

Notes

References

Macclesfield Town F.C. seasons
Macclesfield Town